Brampton Centre is a federal electoral district in Ontario, Canada, that is represented in the House of Commons of Canada. This riding was created in 1996 from parts of Brampton riding and in 2013, Elections Canada redistributed 3 ridings in the city of Brampton to bring back Brampton Centre. This was primarily due to large population increases in the Greater Toronto Area, and Peel Region in particular.

Geography

The riding was recreated for the federal election held 19 October 2015. The newly carved out Brampton Centre riding was reconstituted by taking portions of Brampton—Springdale, Bramalea—Gore—Malton and a small portion of Mississauga—Brampton South.

The new boundaries start from Hurontario Street and Bovaird Drive West; South on Main Street to the intersection of Vodden Street; East on Vodden Street East to Kennedy Road; Kennedy Road south to Steeles Avenue East; West on Steeles Avenue to Hurontario Street; South on Hurontario Street to Highway 407; East on Highway 407 to Torbram Road; North on Torbram Road to Williams Parkway; West on Williams Parkway to Highway 410; North on Highway 410 to Bovaird Drive East; West on Bovaird Drive East to Main Street.

Members of Parliament
The riding has elected the following Members of Parliament:

Election results

2015–present

1997–2000

Demographics

According to the Canada 2021 Census

 Ethnic groups: 30.8% White, 32.3% South Asian, 15.3% Black, 4.5% Latin American, 5.1% Filipino, 1.7% Southeast Asian, 1.5% Indigenous, 1.2% Arab, 1.1% Chinese, 1.1% West Asian

 Languages : 54.0% English, 9.6% Punjabi, 3.4% Urdu, 3.2% Spanish, 2.6% Tagalog, 2.5% Hindi, 1.6% Portuguese, 1.9% Gujarati, 1.0% Italian, 1.2% Tamil
 Religions: 49.7% Christian (24.3% Catholic, 2.7% Pentecostal, 2.5% Anglican, 2.0% United Church, 1.2% Christian Orthodox, 1.0% Baptist, 16.0% Other), 12.5% Hindu, 10.3% Sikh, 9.5% Muslim, 1.3% Buddhist, 16.1% None
 Median income: $37,200 (2020)
 Average income: $43,680 (2020)

See also 
 List of Canadian federal electoral districts
 http://www.redecoupage-federal-redistribution.ca/content.asp?section=on&dir=now/reports/35008&document=index&lang=e
 Past Canadian electoral districts

References

External links 
 Federal riding history from the Library of Parliament
 http://www.elections.ca/res/cir/maps2/mapprov.asp?map=35008&lang=e

Former federal electoral districts of Ontario
Ontario federal electoral districts
Politics of Brampton
1997 establishments in Ontario
2004 disestablishments in Ontario
2015 establishments in Ontario